Microvirga zambiensis  is a Gram-negative, nitrogen-fixing, rod-shaped and non-spore-forming bacteria from the genus of Microvirga.

References

Further reading

External links
Type strain of Microvirga zambiensis at BacDive -  the Bacterial Diversity Metadatabase

Hyphomicrobiales
Bacteria described in 2012